General elections were held on Ascension Island on 26 September 2019 to elect the Island Council, following the dissolution of the previous Council on 1 September. Seven candidates ran for five available Councillor positions.

Electoral system
The Island Council consists of either five or seven elected members, depending on the number of candidates. If there are eight or more candidates, seven members would be elected; if there were fewer than eight candidates, only five would be elected. With only seven candidates running, five seats were available.

The five seats were elected for three years terms by plurality-at-large voting. Voters were able to cast up to five votes.

Results

References

Elections in Ascension Island
Ascension
Ascension
Ascension
Ascension
Election and referendum articles with incomplete results